British International School of Phnom Penh is an international school in Sangkat Prek Eng, Khan Chbar Ampov, Phnom Penh, Cambodia.

It was formerly in the Boeung Keng Kang I area of Phnom Penh.

It was established in 1995.

References

External links
 British International School of Phnom Penh

British international schools
International schools in Cambodia